Galić is a South Slavic surname. It may refer to:

Anita Galić (born 1985), freestyle swimmer from Croatia
Cvitan Galić (1909–1944), Croatian World War II fighter ace
Milan Galić (1938–2014), former Serbian footballer
Stanislav Galić (born 1943), Serb military officer
Valerija Galić (born 1956), vice-president of the Constitutional Court of Bosnia and Herzegovina
Melina Galić, Serbian fashion designer

See also 
 Gaelic (disambiguation)

Croatian surnames
Serbian surnames